Zellaf Reserve is a protected reserve of Libya.

References

Protected areas of Libya